Bog bluegrass is a common name for several plants and may refer to:

Poa leptocoma, native to western North America
Poa paludigena, native to northeastern North America